Kevin Gaines may refer to:
Kevin Gaines (police officer) (1966–1997), Los Angeles officer who became the subject of a wrongful death lawsuit
Kevin Gaines (American football) (born 1971), American football player